Maybach is a brand, marque, and division, of Daimler AG (Daimler-Benz; Mercedes Benz).

Maybach may also refer to:

People

Surname
 Albert von Maybach (1822–1904), German politician
 Christiane Maybach (1932–2006), German actress
 Karl Maybach, son of Wilhelm Maybach, and co-founder of Maybach-Motorenbau
 Ulrich Schmid-Maybach, philanthropist who founded the Maybach Foundation
 Wilhelm Maybach (1846–1929), German internal combustion engineer and industrialist, founder of Maybach-Motorenbau

Stage name
 Maybach Blue Justice (born 1968 as Yuji Nagata), Japanese pro-wrestler
 Maybach Don (born 1967 as Manabu Nakanishi), Japanese pro-wrestler
 Maybach Suwa Jr. (born 1984 as Hajime Ohara), Japanese pro-wrestler
 Maybach Taniguchi (born 1976 as Shuhei Taniguchi ), Japanese pro-wrestler
 Maybach Taniguchi, Jr. (born 1975 as Takahiro Suwa ), Japanese pro-wrestler

Characters
 Alex Maybach, a fictional character created by David Weber for "In Enemy Hands"; see List of characters in the Honorverse

Organizations
 Maybach Foundation, a 501(c)(3) non-profit
 Maybach Music Group, a U.S. record label founded by Rick Ross
 Museum for Historical Maybach Vehicles, Neumarkt in der Oberpfalz, Bavaria, Germany; an automobile museum
 MTU Friedrichshafen, a company spun-off from Daimler's Maybach-Motorenbau GmbH which manufactures what were Maybach engines

Vehicles and transportation
 Maybach double-differential, a type of steering setup
 LaS Maybach (Sd.Kfz.101), Panzerkampfwagen I Ausf.B — WWII Nazi German light tank
 Zmaj Fizir-Maybach, a Fizir F1V produced under license by Zmaj using Maybach engines; a Yugoslavian biplane
 Maybach Specials, a series of Australian built racing cars from the 1950s; see

Other uses
 Maybach I and II, Wunsdorf, Germany; WWII bunkers for Nazi military high command
 "Maybach", a 2008 song by The Yellow Moon Band
 "Maybach" (song), a 2021 song by 42 Dugg

See also

 Maybach Music (disambiguation)
 
 List of WWII Maybach engines